Oectropsis franciscae is a species of beetle in the family Cerambycidae. It was described by Barriga and Cepeda in 2006.

References

Acanthocinini
Beetles described in 2006